Harri Heliövaara and Sem Verbeek were the defending champions but chose not to defend their title.

Marc Polmans and Max Purcell won the title after defeating Luke Saville and Tristan Schoolkate 7–6(7–4), 6–4 in the final.

Seeds

Draw

References

External links
 Main draw

Burnie International - Men's doubles